Charles Nainoa Thompson (born March 11, 1953, in Oahu, Hawaii) is a Native Hawaiian navigator and the president of the Polynesian Voyaging Society.  He is best known as the first Hawaiian to practice the ancient Polynesian art of navigation since the 14th century, having navigated two double-hulled canoes (the Hōkūlea and the Hawaiiloa) from Hawaii to other island nations in Polynesia without the aid of western instruments.

Early life and career

Born in Honolulu, Hawaii, Thompson is a descendant of Alexander Adams and James Harbottle, foreign advisors of the Kingdom of Hawai'i and a direct descendant of Kamehameha I. He graduated from Punahou School in 1972 and earned a BA in Ocean Science in 1986 from the University of Hawaii.  Thompson was trained by master navigator Mau Piailug from the island of Satawal.

His first solo voyage was from Hawaiii to Tahiti in 1980. Since then, Thompson has been the lead navigator on the subsequent voyages of Hōkūlea, including the Voyage of Rediscovery from 1985 to 1987.

On March 18, 2007, Thompson and four other Native Hawaiian navigators were inducted into Pwo as master navigators. The ceremony was conducted by Piailug on Satawal.

In June 2014 he was made a commander of the Order of Tahiti Nui for his work with the Polynesian Voyaging Society.

Currently
Thompson currently serves as the Chair of the Board of Trustees for Kamehameha Schools (a post that his father Myron "Pinky" Thompson also held), and a member of the Board of Regents for the University of Hawaii.

Family and personal life
Thompson is married to KHON-TV2 television anchor Kathy Muneno. They are the parents of twins.

References

Further reading

External links
 Biography from the UH Institute for Astronomy
 Biography from Kamehameha Schools

Native Hawaiian people
Punahou School alumni
University of Hawaii alumni
Hōkūlea
1953 births
Living people
People from Oahu
Polynesian navigators
Commanders of the Order of Tahiti Nui